Nicolás Espinoza (sometimes Nicolás Espinosa) (November 1795 in Tenancingo, Cuscatlán – March 1845 in Nacaome, Honduras) was a Salvadoran general and licenciado who served as Head of State of El Salvador from April 10, 1835 to November 15, 1835. At the time, El Salvador was a constituent state of the Federal Republic of Central America.

Espinoza was vice-head of state of El Salvador under Licenciado José María Silva until Silva was replaced by Joaquín Escolán y Balibrera on March 2, 1835. Escolán served provisionally, and only briefly, until the elected head of state (Espinoza) took office. This occurred on April 10, 1835.

That April Espinoza reestablished the Intendencia General of the Treasury, granting the office judicial functions. In May he reestablished charity committees throughout the state. He also established the jury system for all criminal trials in the state.

By executive decree, the city of Santa Ana was named the capital of the Department of Sonsonate, to which a part of Metapán was added. On May 22, 1835, with the intention of establishing a federal district, the Legislative Assembly formed the Department of Cuscatlán from part of the area of the Department of San Salvador.

By a decree of May 7, 1835, Espinoza restored the separate command of the army by removing political control at the department level. On June 17, 1835, he ordered the sale of uncultivated lands at public auction. On the same day he restored the tobacco monopoly and issued regulations for it.

On November 15, 1835 he was replaced by Colonel Francisco Gómez, on the instructions of Francisco Morazán. He died in Honduras in 1845.

References

1795 births
1845 deaths
People from Cuscatlán Department
Salvadoran people of Spanish descent
Presidents of El Salvador